The Cabinet of Étienne Maurice, comte Gérard was announced on 18 July 1834 by King Louis Philippe I.
It replaced the First cabinet of Nicolas Jean-de-Dieu Soult. 
It was dissolved on 10 November 1834 and replaced by the Cabinet of Hugues-Bernard Maret.

Ministers

The cabinet was created by ordinance of 18 July 1834, with Marshal Étienne Maurice Gérard as President. Apart from replacing Marshal Soult by Marshal Étienne Maurice Gérard as President and Minister of War, the ministers remained the same. The ministers were:

References

Sources

French governments
1834 establishments in France
1834 disestablishments in France
Cabinets established in 1834
Cabinets disestablished in 1834